Escambia Farms is a rural, unincorporated community in northern Okaloosa County, Florida, United States. It is part of the Fort Walton Beach–Crestview–Destin Metropolitan Statistical Area.

History

Escambia Farms was a planned community created by the U.S. government in the 1930s to ease the effects of the Depression on farmers. Eighty-one homes were built on 115 tracts of land.

References

External links
 Northwest Florida Daily News
 Baker Block Museum
 The Library of Congress Prints and Photographs Division

Unincorporated communities in Okaloosa County, Florida
Populated places established in the 1930s
Unincorporated communities in Florida